Udodovsky is a rural locality (a khutor) in Trostyanskoye Rural Settlement, Novoanninsky District, Volgograd Oblast, Russia. The population was 182 as of 2010. There are 4 streets.

Geography 
Udodovsky is located in forest steppe on the Khopyorsko-Buzulukskaya Plain, 59 km southeast of Novoanninsky (the district's administrative centre) by road. Trostyansky is the nearest rural locality.

References 

Rural localities in Novoanninsky District